Novoaktau (Yañı Aqtaw) is a rural locality (a selo) in Karansky Selsoviet, Buzdyaksky District, Bashkortostan, Russia. The population was 141 as of 2010. There are 4 streets.

Geography 
Novoaktau is located 31 km northwest of Buzdyak (the district's administrative centre) by road. Syunbash is the nearest rural locality.

References 

Rural localities in Buzdyaksky District